Joanna Cooper (born 3 December 1983) is a Canadian international lawn bowler.

Biography
She was born in Calgary, Alberta, Canada and was selected as part of the Canadian team for the 2018 Commonwealth Games on the Gold Coast in Queensland where she reached the semi finals of the Fours with Pricilla Westlake, Leanne Chinery and Jackie Foster.

In 2020 she was selected for the 2020 World Outdoor Bowls Championship in Australia.

References

External links
 Joanna Cooper at Bowls Canada
 

1983 births
Living people
Canadian female bowls players
Commonwealth Games competitors for Canada
Bowls players at the 2018 Commonwealth Games
21st-century Canadian women